Alon Ben Dor (born 18 March 1952) is an Israeli footballer. He competed in the men's tournament at the 1976 Summer Olympics.

References

External links
 

1952 births
Living people
Israeli footballers
Hapoel Be'er Sheva F.C. players
Beitar Be'er Sheva F.C. players
Hapoel Ashkelon F.C. players
Hapoel Marmorek F.C. players
Israel international footballers
Olympic footballers of Israel
Footballers at the 1976 Summer Olympics
Place of birth missing (living people)
Association football defenders